Cara sposa (Dear Wife) is a 1977 Italian comedy film directed by Pasquale Festa Campanile.

Plot 
Alfredo, jailed for theft and fraud, after having served the sentence discovers that his wife Adelina no longer wishes to live with him.

Cast 

 Johnny Dorelli : Alfredo
 Agostina Belli : Adelina
 Mario Pilar : Giovannino
 Lina Volonghi :   Rosa Balestra 
 Enzo Cannavale   : Salomone 
 Pina Cei :  Elvira 
 Carlo Bagno :  Elvira's companion

See also     
 List of Italian films of 1977

References

External links

1977 films
Italian comedy films
1977 comedy films
Films directed by Pasquale Festa Campanile
Films scored by Stelvio Cipriani
1970s Italian-language films
1970s Italian films